"Statuesque" is a song by Britpop band Sleeper, written by the band's vocalist and guitarist Louise Wener. "Statuesque" was the fourth and final single to be released from Sleeper's second album The It Girl and became the group's last top twenty hit on the UK Singles Chart.

Background

"Statuesque" soundtracked a key scene at the end of the 1996 hit movie Trainspotting, and featured on the additional soundtrack album Trainspotting #2: Music from the Motion Picture, Vol. #2 the following year. Sleeper had also covered Blondie's 1980 hit "Atomic", for the movie; a remix of the song backed the single formats, along with a remix of "Statuesque" by then Evening Session DJ Steve Lamacq. For the b-sides of "Statuesque", Sleeper recorded two new tracks "She's a Sweetheart" and "Spies", as well as a cover of Elvis Costello's "The Other End of the Telescope", after Costello covered their own "What Do I Do Now?".

Track listing

UK 7" single Indolent SLEEP 014 (ltd no'd edition of 10,000; with poster)

"Statuesque" – 4:34
"She's a Sweetheart" – 3:31

UK CD single Indolent SLEEP 014CD1

"Statuesque" – 4:34
"She's a Sweetheart" – 3:31 
"Spies" – 3:14

UK CD single Indolent SLEEP 014CD2

"Statuesque" – 4:34
"Statuesque (The Boxed Off mix)" – 6:11
"The Other End of the Telescope" – 4:31 
"Atomic (Wubble U mix)" – 8:21

Australia CD single BMG 74321 42243-2

"Statuesque" – 4:34
"She's a Sweetheart" – 3:31 
"Spies" – 3:14
"Statuesque (The Boxed Off mix)" – 6:11
"The Other End of the Telescope" – 4:31 
"Atomic (Wubble U mix)" – 8:21

Critical reception
Jack Rabid of AllMusic called the track "Blondie-like", likening it in particular to "(I'm Always Touched by Your) Presence, Dear".

Comprehensive charts

References

External links
"Statuesque" music video

1996 singles
Sleeper (band) songs
Songs written by Louise Wener
Song recordings produced by Stephen Street
1996 songs